The 2016–17 Dayton Flyers men's basketball team represented the University of Dayton during the 2016–17 NCAA Division I men's basketball season. The Flyers, led by sixth-year head coach Archie Miller, played their home games at the University of Dayton Arena as members of the Atlantic 10 Conference. They finished the season 24–8, 15–3 in A-10 play to win the regular season A-10 championship. They received the No. 1 seed in the A-10 tournament where they lost in the quarterfinals to Davidson. They received an at-large bid to the NCAA tournament where they lost in the first round to Wichita State.

On March 25, 2017, Archie Miller left the school to accept the head coaching position at Indiana. He finished at Dayton with a six year record of 139–63. The school then hired Dayton alum Anthony Grant as the new head coach on March 30.

Previous season
The Flyers finished the 2015–16 season with a record of 25–8, 14–4 in A-10 play to become regular season A-10 co-champions. They defeated Richmond in the quarterfinals of the A-10 tournament to advance to the semifinals where they lost to Saint Joseph's. They received an at-large bid to the NCAA tournament, their third consecutive at-large bid, as a No. 7 seed in the Midwest Region where they lost to No. 10 seed Syracuse in the first round.

Preseason 
The Flyers were picked to win the A-10 in the conference's preseason poll. Charles Cooke and Scoochie Smith were selected to the preseason All-A-10 first team. Cooke and Kyle Davis were also selected to the All-Defensive team.

Departures

Incoming recruits

Roster

Schedule and results

|-
!colspan=9 style=| Exhibition

|-
!colspan=9 style=| Non-conference regular season

|-
!colspan=9 style=|Atlantic 10 regular season

|-
!colspan=9 style=|Atlantic 10 tournament

|-
!colspan=9 style=|NCAA tournament

References

Dayton Flyers Men's
Dayton Flyers men's basketball seasons
Dayton
Dayton
Dayton